Carl Jammes Calingayan Martin (born 18 May 1999) is a Filipino professional boxer. He held the GAB super bantamweight title from December 2021 to August 2022 and has held the WBA Asia super bantamweight title since March 2022. Martin currently trains and fights out of Lagawe.

Early life and amateur career

Martin was born and raised in Lagawe, a 4th class municipality of Ifugao province. He was introduced to boxing in his early age and as an amateur boxer Martin won the Paperweight Bronze Medal at the Philippine Youth Games-Batang Pinoy, before turning pro in 2016, at the age of 16.

Professional career

Bantamweight division
Martin made his professional debut on 5 March 2016, defeating fellow Filipino boxer, Jayar Omac via a round two corner retirement. A couple of months later, Martin registered his second professional win by defeating fellow Filipino boxer, Noel Guliman via a round two technical knockout. He extended his winning streak to three after defeating Manny Mamacquiao via a technical knockout in the fifth round.

Martin won his first title by defeating Jason Buenaobra, winning the bout via a unanimous decision through eight rounds. Following the bout, Martin defeated Jerry Mae Villagracia via a second round knockout.

Martin captured his first national title by defeating veteran boxer Vincent Bautista via a round five corner retirement.

He became the interim WBC Asian Boxing Council Continental bantamweight champion when he defeated Artid Bamrungauea of Thailand on December 23, 2017.

Martin battles Hashimu Zuberi of Tanzania on April 28, 2018, beating the Tanzanian by technical knockout in Round 2, Martin won the vacant World Boxing Organisation Oriental Youth bantamweight title. 

Martin then fought the rough Indonesian in George Lumoly for the vacant WBA Asia bantamweight title in June 2018, Martin KO'ed Lumoly in Round 3 of 12. 

On August 6, 2018, Martin defeated Huerban Qiatehe of China by RTD, Qiatehe was battered from the first round with heavy punches that pushed the Chinese to retire from his corner in round 6, retaining his WBO Oriental Youth bantamweight title. 

A couple of months later, Martin defended his WBA Asia bantamweight crown by defeating Korean boxer Moon Chul Suh via a knockout in the fourth round.

On 16 February 2019, Martin defeated Thai boxer Petchchorhae Kokietgym in his first fight outside of his hometown, the Ifugao province, via a round three corner retirement. Following the bout, he defeated another Thai boxer in Yutthichai Wannawong by technical knockout in the first round.

Three months later, Martin won the PBF bantamweight title for the second time after defeating fellow Filipino boxer Benezer Alolod by technical knockout in round 7. Following the bout, Martin defended his crown as he defeated Philip Luis Cuerdo by technical knockout in the third round.

Super Bantamweight division
Almost a year of being sidelined due to the COVID-19 pandemic, Martin moved up one division to super bantamweight and defeated Richard Rosales via a unanimous decision. A couple of months later, he defeated Joe Tejones by knockout in the fifth round.

May 12, 2021 Martin defeated the veteran Mark Anthony Geraldo via unanimous decision (117-111, 115-113, 115-113) to win the Philippine super bantamweight championship.

Three months later, Martin defeated Ronnie Baldonado via a eleventh round technical knockout and captured the Philippine Games & Amusements Board and the vacant WBA Asia super bantamweight titles.

On 30 July 2022, Martin defended his WBA Asia super bantamweight crown by defeating Tanzanian boxer Charles Tondo via a unanimous decision.

Professional boxing record

Titles in boxing

Regional titles
Interim WBC-ABCO Continental bantamweight title (118 lbs)
WBO Oriental Youth bantamweight title  (118 lbs)
WBA Asia bantamweight title (118 lbs)
WBA Asia super bantamweight title (122 lbs)

National titles
 bantamweight title (118 lbs)
Interim  bantamweight title (118 lbs)
 PBF bantamweight title (118 lbs)
GAB super bantamweight title (122 lbs)

References

External links
 

1999 births
Bantamweight boxers
Super-bantamweight boxers
Living people
Filipino male boxers
People from Ifugao